In mathematics, mixed Hodge modules are the culmination of Hodge theory, mixed Hodge structures, intersection cohomology, and the decomposition theorem yielding a coherent framework for discussing variations of degenerating mixed Hodge structures through the six functor formalism. This makes it possible to construct a Hodge structure on intersection cohomology, one of the key problems when the subject was discovered. This was solved by Morihiko Saito who found a way to use the filtration on a coherent D-module as an analogue of the Hodge filtration for a Hodge structure. This made it possible to give a Hodge structure on an intersection cohomology sheaf, the simple objects in the Abelian category of perverse sheaves.

Abstract structure 
Before going into the nitty gritty details of defining Mixed hodge modules, which is quite elaborate, it is useful to get a sense of what the category of Mixed Hodge modules actually provides. Given a complex algebraic variety  there is an abelian category pg 339 with the following functorial properties

 There is a faithful functor  called the rationalization functor. This gives the underlying rational perverse sheaf of a mixed Hodge module.
 There is a faithful functor  sending a mixed Hodge module to its underlying D-module
 These functors behave well with respect to the Riemann-Hilbert correspondence , meaning for every mixed Hodge module  there is an isomorphism .

In addition, there are the following categorical properties

 The category of mixed Hodge modules over a point is isomorphic to the category of Mixed hodge structures, 
 Every object  in  admits a weight filtration  such that every morphism in  preserves the weight filtration strictly, the associated graded objects  are semi-simple, and in the category of mixed Hodge modules over a point, this corresponds to the weight filtration of a Mixed hodge structure.

  don't increase the weights of a complex  of mixed Hodge modules.
  don't decrease the weights of a complex  of mixed Hodge modules.

Relation between derived categories 
The derived category of mixed Hodge modules  is intimately related to the derived category of constructuctible sheaves  equivalent to the derived category of perverse sheaves. This is because of how the rationalization functor is compatible with the cohomology functor  of a complex  of mixed Hodge modules. When taking the rationalization, there is an isomorphismfor the middle perversity . Notepg 310 this is the function  sending , which differs from the case of pseudomanifolds where the perversity is a function  where . Recall this is defined as taking the composition of perverse truncations with the shift functor, sopg 341This kind of setup is also reflected in the derived push and pull functors  and with nearby and vanishing cycles , the rationalization functor takes these to their analogous perverse functors on the derived category of perverse sheaves.

Tate modules and cohomology 
This object is useful because it can be used to compute the various cohomologies of  through the six functor formalism and give them a mixed Hodge structure. These can be summarized with the tableMoreover, given a closed embedding  there is the local cohomology group

Variations of Mixed Hodge structures 
In order to better understand these variations, the decomposition theorem and intersection cohomology are required.

Intersection cohomology 
One of the defining features of the category of mixed Hodge modules is the fact intersection cohomology can be phrased in its language. This makes it possible to use the decomposition theorem for maps  of varieties. To define the intersection complex, let  be the open smooth part of a variety . Then the intersection complex of  can be defined aswhereas with perverse sheavespg 311. In particular, this setup can be used to show the intersection cohomology groupshave a pure weight  Hodge structure.

See also 
 Mixed motives (math)
 Deligne cohomology

References 

 A young person's guide to mixed Hodge modules

Algebraic geometry
Generalized manifolds
Homological algebra
Hodge theory